Mary Boone (b. 1952) is an American art dealer and collector. She is credited with championing and fostering dozens of contemporary artists who have made significant contributions to the work of art in the late 20th and early 21st century including David Salle, Eric Fischl, Ai Wei Wei, Barbara Kruger, Laurie Simmons, Peter Halley, Ross Bleckner, and Jean-Michel Basquiat.

Early Life and Education
Boone moved to New York City at the age of 19 from Erie, Pennsylvania. Her parents were working class Egyptian immigrants. 

Boone studied Art History at Rhode Island School of Design and received her BFA in Sculpture in 1973. 

She met sculptor Lynda Benglis at Hunter College and the artist introduced her to the director of Bykert Gallery, Klaus Kertess, where she would eventually work.

Mary Boone Gallery

In 1977, Boone opened a gallery, Mary Boone Gallery, in SoHo, New York.  The gallery quickly rose to prominence by exhibiting new painters associated with Neo-expressionism such as Eric Fischl, Julian Schnabel, and David Salle. Whereas conceptual and minimal approaches to sculpture had dominated the 1970s in the art and cultural downtown scenes, Boone's gallery and presence throughout the 1980s offered a fresh and prophetic departure from status quo by supporting a revival in painting. 

In 1982, Boone was named "The New Queen of the Art Scene" by New York magazine. She would go on to play an important role in the New York art market and shaping contemporary art in the 1980s. 

The Swiss art dealer and collector Bruno Bischofberger partnered with the gallery and mounted early shows featuring the painter Jean Michel Basquiat. Basquiat joined Boone's gallery in 1984 after his first solo show there. The two galleries shared a selection of artists. Boone successfully brought a Neo-expressionist movement to Europe and Bischofberger situated these American painters alongside the post-war painters like Anselm Kiefer and Georg Baselitz.

In 1987, the American conceptual artist Barbara Kruger became the first woman artist to join the gallery proving that Boone was adept at keeping an eye on the pulse of contemporary art and its predilection for "deconstructivist" appropriation at the time. 

The gallery played a significant role in the development of the art market in the 1980s. Boone was one of the first dealers to require waiting lists for collectors to buy works not yet produced. A keen eye for strategic relevance enabled her to stay afloat during changes in the art market. 

In the early 2000s, Will Cotton, Tom Sachs, and Inka Essenhigh joined the gallery's roster.

Boone's career as an art dealer spans the epoch formally classified as Contemporary Art and she is regarded as one of the most successful art dealers of her generation. Though Boone's reputation in the art world has fluctuated as drastically as the art market itself over the past four decades. 

In September 2018, Boone pleaded guilty to filing false income tax returns and "agreed to pay more than $3 million in restitution for taxes she owes for 2009, 2010, and 2011." During the trial proceedings, collectors, dealers, artists Wendy White and Sheila Pepe, and art critic Jerry Saltz gave testimony to Boone's character and her lifelong dedication to the art establishment. "Mary's been a target forEVER," Pepe tweeted, "Like all the boys aren't cooking the books." On February 14, 2019, Boone was sentenced to 30 months in federal prison. In a statement to ArtNews, Boone said "If I’m going to be the Martha Stewart of the art world, I would hope to do it with the same humility, humor, grace and intelligence that she did. I’m trying to be optimistic and see this as a learning experience.”  She was released in 2021.

Artists 
Artists who have been represented or shown by the Mary Boone Gallery include:

Representation in Film and Popular Media

Mary Boone was portrayed by Parker Posey in Julian Schnabel's 1996 biographical drama, Basquiat, accompanied by Dennis Hopper as Bischofberger.

References

External links
 Mary Boone Gallery website

</ref>

American art dealers
Women art dealers
Rhode Island School of Design alumni
Living people
1951 births
Hunter College alumni
People from Erie, Pennsylvania
Businesspeople from Pennsylvania
20th-century American businesspeople
20th-century American businesswomen
21st-century American businesspeople
21st-century American businesswomen